HMS Carysfort was a  destroyer of the Royal Navy. She was ordered in 1941, originally under the name HMS Pique.

Her name was changed to conform with the initials "Ca" to her seven sister ships. She is named after John Proby, a politician who was also a Lord of the Admiralty in 1750. In 1752 he was created Baron Carysfort. His son, William Proby, Lord Proby, and his grandson, Granville Proby, 3rd Earl of Carysfort, were both naval officers, the latter eventually became an Admiral. She was the fifth Royal Navy warship to carry the name Carysfort. She was built and engined by J. Samuel White & Co. The keel was to be laid down on 4 May 1943 but was delayed until 12 May 1943 because of German bombing raids. She was launched on 25 July 1944 and completed on 20 February 1945. Her original pennant number was R25 changing to D25 after the Second World War.

Operational service
From June to October 1945, Caryfort was refitted at Devonport, having the ship's planned Director Control Tower fitted. She was then ordered to join the East Indies Fleet, where she took part in operations against Indonesian nationalist forces in the Dutch East Indies.

After returning to Britain early in 1946, Carysfort was placed in reserve at Portsmouth, briefly recommissioning in 1947 for a training cruise to the Mediterranean before returning to reserve. She was modernised by Yarrows at their Scotstoun shipyard between 23 January 1954 and 14 December 1956, and then re-entered service as part of the 6th Destroyer Squadron. Carysfort served two commissions with the 6th Squadron, with the flotilla alternating between home waters and the Mediterranean. From 1956 to 1958 R J Trowbridge captained her in the Mediterranean. In 1959 Carysfort was part of the Home Fleet and took part in 'Navy Days' in Portsmouth during that year. She subsequently served in the Far East during the Indonesian Confrontation.

Between November 1962 and May 1964 she underwent a refit at Gibraltar and then joined the 27th Escort Squadron and spent two deployments in the Mediterranean and Far East. In June 1966, Carysfort was ordered to the Seychelles when labour disputes brought the threat of violence. While no intervention by the destroyer was needed in the end, the ship's crew suffered an outbreak of dysentery while at the Seychelles, forcing the temporary introduction of quarantine measures aboard the ship to control the outbreak. Her last deployment was to the Far East between 20 November 1967 and 14 November 1968.

She remained in the Active Fleet until February 1969 when she was placed in Reserve. After being placed on the Disposal List she was sold on 20 October 1970 to BISCO for demolition by J Cashmore. She arrived in tow at the breakers yard in Newport on 15 November that year.

References

Publications

External links
 Jim Donaldson's♙Unofficial Site

 

1944 ships
C-class destroyers (1943) of the Royal Navy
World War II destroyers of the United Kingdom
Ships built on the Isle of Wight